The Columbia School District is a public school district based in Columbia, Mississippi (USA).

Schools
Columbia High School (Grades 9–12)
Jefferson Middle School (Grades 6–8)
Columbia Elementary School (Grades 4–5)
Columbia Primary School 2–3 (Grades 2–3)
Columbia Primary School PK–1 (Grades PK–1)

Demographics

2006–07 school year
There were a total of 1,895 students enrolled in the Columbia School District during the 2006–2007 school year. The gender makeup of the district was 51% female and 49% male. The racial makeup of the district was 49.23% African American, 49.18% White, 1.11% Asian, 0.42% Hispanic, and 0.05% Native American. 67.1% of the district's students were eligible to receive free lunch.

Previous school years

Accountability statistics

See also
List of school districts in Mississippi

References

External links

Education in Marion County, Mississippi
School districts in Mississippi
Columbia, Mississippi